Sopris was an unincorporated community located in Las Animas County, Colorado, United States.  The town is now under the surface of Trinidad Lake in Trinidad Lake State Park.

The U.S. Post Office at Trinidad (ZIP Code 81082) now serves Sopris postal addresses.

The community was named after General E. B. Sopris, a local land owner.

Geography
Sopris is located at  (37.169208,-104.493885).

References

Former populated places in Las Animas County, Colorado
Ghost towns in Colorado